Rail transport in Ukraine is a mode of transport by railway in Ukraine. Railway infrastructure transport in Ukraine in majority is owned by government of Ukraine through Ukrzaliznytsia (Ukrainian Railways) that officially has a country-wide monopoly on passenger and freight transport by rail.

A portion of the Ukrainian rail network in eastern Ukraine was privatized in the late 1990 creating from those assets the biggest private railway company in the country, Lemtrans. Lemtrans is focused on freight transport.

History

Before Ukrainian independence

The railways in Ukraine were first built under the imperial rule of the Austro-Hungarian Empire (in the western territories, Kingdom of Galicia and Lodomeria, Duchy of Bukovina and the Hungarian comitatus in Carpathian region), and later in the Russian Empire-controlled territories that held bigger portion of modern Ukraine, having seen major development and reformation since then.

On the territory of modern Ukraine, trains that were headed by self-propelled locomotives (as opposed to horse-drawn trains) appeared in the 1860s on the efforts of Prince Leon Sapieha. He initiated the extension of the Galician Railway of Archduke Charles Louis from Przemyśl (Premissel) to Lviv (Lemberg). The first train arrived in Lemberg on 4 November 1861.

After the war, in 1856 the Russian authorities dismantled the line.

Later in 1860s the line from Lviv was extended towards Chernivtsi (at that time Czernowitz was a capital of a crown land Duchy of Bukovina) and Iași (at that time Jassy was in the Kingdom of Romania). Also in 1865 in the Russian Ukraine railroad started to be built from Odessa towards Balta.

In 1869–70 in Russian Ukrainian gubernias saw the start of a major construction of the railway network from Kursk in the west to Kyiv and south towards Lozova (between Kharkiv and Dnipro) passing Kharkiv. Between Darnytsia and Kyiv the Struve Railroad Bridge was built. The Lozova railroad expanded eastwards towards the Donbas area through Sloviansk and reaching Horlivka. At about the same time the line between Odessa and Balta via Kremenchuk–Kriukiv was extended towards Poltava providing for a line on both banks of the River Dnieper.

In Kriukiv (now Kremenchuk) the Kryukiv Railway Car Building Works was built. In 1869 the Rostov-on-Don to Taganrog line was extended to Horlivka. Also in Austria, the railroad was extended from Lviv towards the Austria-Russia border near Brody and in 1870 it was extended to Ternopil (Tarnopol). In 1870 Kyiv, Vinnytsia and Zhmerynka were connected with the Odessa–Balta railway.

In 1871 the first Austria-Russia border rail crossing was built when Ternopil was connected with Zhmerynka over the Zbruch River near Volochysk and Pidvolochysk located on opposite banks of the river. In 1871 Poltava was connected with Kharkiv providing with an alternative to reach the city of Odessa and its port with the Russian central provinces through Kharkiv.

In 1872-73 a major expansion of the railway network started in Russian Volhynia branching out from the Kyiv-Odessa line near Koziatyn west pass Brest-Litovsk and connecting cities such as Kovel, Rivne, Zdolbuniv, Shepetivka and Berdychiv. In 1873 a branch line from Zdolbuniv was extended to Brody becoming another railway border crossing. Some railway network expansion took place in the Donbas area as well.

In 1873 from Znamianka in Central Ukraine located on the Poltava-Balta road another branch was stretched south towards the port of Mykolaiv on the Black Sea making it the second seaport in Ukraine connected to the railway network. At about that time the railway system expanded further towards the Drohobych-Boryslav oil fields and greater Sambor areas in the Ukrainian Carpathians and another branch line was extended along the Tisza River in Hungary.

In 1873-75 the line from Lozova was expanded towards the Crimean peninsula connecting Sevastopol with Kharkiv via the Chonhar peninsula.

For more information, see:
Imperial Royal Austrian State Railways
Hungarian State Railways (For Zakarpattia region)
History of rail transport in Russia
History of rail transport in Poland
Rail transport in the Soviet Union

List of populated places established with railroads
 20ty richia Zhovtnia (Zaliznychne)
 Haichur (Ternuvate)
 Irpin
 Koziatyn
 Zhuliany (Vyshneve)
 Znamianka

Independent Ukraine

On 24 September 1991, following the resolution of the Verkhovna Rada (Ukraine's parliament) on separation from the Soviet Union, all railroad administration was temporarily passed to the South-Western Railways. According to the resolution, all assets located within the borders of the former Ukrainian SSR became property of Ukraine. To improve efficiency a special centralized administration was created. On 14 December 1991 the Cabinet of Ministers of Ukraine issued declaration No. 356 "In creation of the State Administration of Railroad Transportation in Ukraine" which proclaimed Ukrzaliznytsia a government body in administration railroad transportation uniting the six state railroad companies.

As of 2015 the Ukrainian government transformed the railways into a public joint-stock company named Ukrainian Railways.

2022 Russian invasion
The 2022 Russian invasion of Ukraine showed the crucial role of railways in both civilian and military logistics in the area. Given the lack of roads passable during Rasputitsa and the Russian lack of vehicles capable of off-road operation, logistics relied heavily on rail transport. Railway nodes became an important target of Russian attacks to maintain their own supply lines and disrupt those of Ukraine. At the same time, Ukraine's exports and imports were shifted even more to rail than in peacetime as Russia captured or cut off many important Black Sea Ports which usually handle a large share of Ukraine's external trade. Railways were crucial in transporting refugees and European governments, and state railways organized special trains for humanitarian aid to and from Ukraine. As airports were targets of Russian attacks and/or Ukrainian counter-attacks, trains were also used for diplomatic visits by foreign heads of state and government.

2022 rail freight crisis 

Due to the 2022 Russian invasion of Ukraine, many of the country's Black Sea ports were blocked, prompting a crisis in the export of agricultural products that were normally shipped.  Railway freight has become the most viable alternative, but the Ukrainian railway network has not been able to cope with the demand, mainly because of the railway break-of-gauge between Ukraine's Soviet-era 1520 mm gauge railways and the standard-gauge railway (1435 mm) of states west of its borders has created bottlenecks at  transloading stations.  On 7 April 2022, Ukrzaliznytsia reported that 10,320 wagons (about half of the total) were waiting at the Ustyluh (Izov)–Hrubieszów border crossing on the Linia Hutnicza Szerokotorowa line, the main railway connection between Ukraine and Poland and the longest 1,520 mm gauge railway of Poland. 

Efforts to quickly increase rail freight capacity have been launched, including construction of new large transloading stations near Mostyska and elsewhere, mainly in Poland.  As of 12 April 2022, the Mostyka station was planned to be completed by June 2022, with a transloading capacity of 50,000 metric tonnes of grain per month by July, and 100,000 tonnes by September.  Additional challenges included the need to increase the number of wagons, appropriate permits to let Ukrainian wagons ride in EU territory, and to increase the capacity of EU ports (such as Gdańsk, Hamburg and Rotterdam) that would have to take over the shipping role of the blocked Black Sea ports.  There are also proposed to build more 1,520 mm gauge railway lines in Poland and Germany, eventually as far to the Netherlands.

Some railway stations have also been damaged due to the present war.

Restoration and modernisation 
By October 2022, large-scale operations were underway to repair all damaged railway infrastructure with great precision, while mines were cleared and unexploded ordnance were defused or safely detonated and removed. The railways had proven to serve an essential role for Ukrainian military, cilivian and humanitarian logistics, and the recapture of Russian-occupied train tracks seriously disrupted the logistics of invading forces. Ukrainian Railways was also in the process of planning the replacement of its 1,520 mm gauge with the 1,435 mm standard-gauge railway for future integration with the European Union's rail network.

In early February 2022 (just before the Russian invasion began), upon returning from a visit to Poland, Infrastructure Minister Oleksandr Kubrakov, his deputy Mustafa Nayyem and Ukrzaliznytsia CEO Oleksandr Kamyshin announced that Ukraine and Poland had agreed that a high-speed rail link would be built between Kyiv and Warsaw through , reducing travel times by four hours. Ukrzaliznytsia also decided to remove all restrictions on rail transit to Poland beginning on 10 February 2022. After the 2022 Russian invasion of Ukraine caused a lot of damage to Ukrainian railway and airport infrastructure, the Polish government in October 2022 offered to Ukraine help post-war reconstruction, as well as adding an extra high-speed rail link between Lublin and Lviv through Zamość and Bełżec.

In October 2022 the border crossing from Rakhiv south to Valea Vișeului railway station in Romania (closed in 2011) was reopened.

Infrastructure 

Railways in Ukraine use various gauge types. The broad gauge (1,520 mm), a legacy of Imperial Russian and Soviet times, dominates the landscape, and narrow-gauge railways (750 mm) also exist, but plans are being made to construct, restore or switch to more standard-gauge railways (1,435 mm) for better train connections with the rest of Europe. About half of railways in Ukraine are electrified (some of which have been damaged during the ongoing Russo-Ukrainian War and temporarily switched to diesel trains).

Railways by gauge

Broad gauge (1,520 mm) 
The infrastructure also contains 5,422 railway crossings (level crossing), 4,168 of which employ an automatic signaling system. At the same time 1,497 crossings are staffed 1,468 out of those equipped with automatic signaling system (grade crossing signals).

Standard gauge (1,435 mm) 
As of May 2022, Ukraine had many stretches of standard gauge rail, although several had not seen use for decades. The  80-kilometre-long railroad from Kovel railway station to Yahodyn railway station near the Ukrainian–Polish border was the longest standard-gauge track in Ukraine at the time; in May 2021, Ukrainian Railways started electrifying and modernising this route. Specialised freight fleets at Kovel station compatible with the European network had not been in use for almost 30 years, however. From Chop to Mukachevo and to the railway station at Nevetlenfolu (Diakovo) in Zakarpattia, large sections of rail track are of European width as well.

Since the 2010s, but especially since the February 2022 Russian invasion of Ukraine, much urge has been given to plans to build new standard-gauge connections between the largest cities and EU countries, and switch over parts of the Ukrainian network from 1,520 mm to standard gauge. Although switching the entire network over quickly would not be realistic, the construction or renewal of standard-gauge border crossings were deemed viable options to be prioritised. In February 2021, plans were drafted by the Ministry of Infrastructure for building four sections with a total length of 2,000 km, with a top train speed of over 250 km/h. The first and longest of these would be a 896 km-long track between Kyiv and Lviv, onwards to the Ukrainian-Polish border. The plans also included standard-gauge rail between Chernivtsi and Siret, Romania, as well as restoring the European gauge between Chop and Uzhhorod. Restoration of the Mostyska-1 to Rodatychi standard-gauge track is also under discussion.

Narrow gauges (750 mm) 

Various  gauge railways operate in Ukraine as common carrier, industrial railway or children's railways.

Rail links with adjacent countries 

Same gauge:
 Belarus. Closed due to the 2022 Russian invasion of Ukraine.
 Russia. Crimean Bridge opened in 2019 under Russian occupation. Closed due to the 2022 Russian invasion of Ukraine.
 Moldova. One link, requires transit through Transnistria, temporarily closed due to invasion. Another link through Transnistria was closed for several decades before August 2022.
 Break-of-gauge: /
 Romania
 Hungary
 Poland (plus a broad gauge cross-border cargo line, the Linia Hutnicza Szerokotorowa)
 Slovakia (plus a broad gauge cross-border cargo line, the Uzhhorod–Košice broad-gauge track)

Stations 

In 2020, there were 1,402 stations, that had 118 various station buildings. There were 2,268 smaller halts.  The network is fully interconnected, central-dispatched and consists of 1,648 stations of all sizes spread throughout the country. The largest stations are Nyzhnodniprovsk-Vuzol (in the city of Dnipro) and Darnytsia (in the capital Kyiv) – both freight.

 Intermediate
 Sorting
 Freight
 Sectional
 Passenger

Railway stations also have five classes depending on their general performance. Some stations may be named as railway stop, platform number, passing loop or simply kilometer post.

Infrastructure projects

Beskydy Tunnel 
The Beskydy Tunnel was inaugurated in May 2018, serving as the most important rail link between Ukraine and the pan-European railway network, handling 60% of Ukraine-EU freight traffic. The project was supported by the European Union, the European Investment Bank (EIB), and the European Bank for Reconstruction and Development (EBRD). The new tunnel more than doubles the output on the line, to 100 trains from the previous 45, and allows a speed increase from 40 km/h to 70 km/h.

Kyiv – Vasylkiv electrification project 
In 2021 the electrification of the track section Vasylkiv 1 – Vasylkiv 2 is planned, which will enable the launch of electric suburban rail between Kyiv and Vasylkiv. The project involves the reconstruction of the Boyarka electrical substation, track works and a new passenger platform.

Zhytomyr – Zviahel line upgrade 
In 2021, the line between Zhytomyr and Zviahel is planned to be modernized and electrified.

Kyiv – Cherkasy electrification 
The project envisages the electrification of the 30 km section between Taras Shevchenko (Smila) and Cherkasy stations, which is the only non-electrified section between Cherkasy and Kyiv. The project will enable the launch of INTERCITY+ services between Kyiv and Cherkasy, reducing travel time from 3 hours 41 minutes to 2 hours and 45 minutes. Ukrainian Railways plans to carry out service using Skoda City Elephant EJ675 double decker electric multiple units.

Rolling stock

Because of the difference in gauges, most of Ukraine's rolling stock cannot move across standard gauge rail into neighbouring countries to its west, namely Poland, Slovakia, Hungary, and Romania. Although replacing the bogies would make wagons compatible with most Romanian and Bulgarian railways, '[Ukrainian] grain wagons have a width of 3,224 mm, while the maximum allowable one in many European countries is 3,150 mm, and the axle load of [Ukrainian] wagons is up to 23.5 tons with the maximum allowable 18–20 tons in many neighboring countries. Therefore, in Hungary, Slovakia, and Poland, basically only European wagons can be used.' Specialised freight fleets at Kovel railway station compatible with the European network can move across Ukraine's longest standard-gauge track into Poland, but as of 2022 had not been in use for almost 30 years.

Rail and train companies

Operators 
 Ukrainian Railways (Ukrzaliznytsia), the state-owned joint-stock company that has a de facto monopoly on rail transport operations in Ukraine. Plans exist for creating a more competitive market.

Manufacturers

Locomotives 
 Luhanskteplovoz, former producer of locomotives (in 2007-2016 belonged to Russian Transmashholding)
 Malyshev Factory, former producer of locomotives as Kharkiv Steam-locomotive Factory
 Dnipro Electrical Locomotive Works, producer of electrical locomotives
 Ukrzaliznychpostach
 Vinnytsiatransprylad
 Ukrainian state center of railroad refrigerated transportation
 Ukrainian state center in exploitation of specialized rolling stock "Ukrspecrailcar"

Railcars 
 Kryukiv Railcar Works, primary producer of small locomotives and railcars 
 Stakhanov Railway Car Building Works, railcar production
 DniproVahonMash (Dnieper Railcar Works), railcar production

Supporting 
 Kryvyi Rih Diesel Engines, diesel engines
 LuhCentroKuz, rail axles

Trams 
 Elektron, producer of tramways
 Yuzhmash (along with Tatra Yuga), producer of tramways

Repair factories 
 Darnytsia Railcar Repair
 Dnipro Railcar Repair
 Dnipro Diesel Locomotive Repair
 Haivoron Diesel Locomotive Repair
 Hnivan factory of special reinforced concrete
 Izyum Diesel Locomotive Repair
 Ivano-Frankivsk Locomotive Repair
 Lviv Locomotive Repair
 Kharkiv Railcar Repair
 Konotop Railcar Repair
 Korosten factory of reinforced concrete railroad ties
 Kremenchuk factory of reinforced concrete railroad ties
 Kyiv Electric Railcar Repair
 Poltava Diesel Locomotive Repair
 Popasna railcar maintenance shop
 Starokostyantyniv factory of reinforced concrete railroad ties
 Stryi railcar maintenance shop
 Zaporizhia Electric Locomotive Repair
 Zhmerynka Railcar Repair

Rail stock research 
 Ukrainian Research Institute of Railcar Construction, Kremenchuk

Others 
 Central station of communication
 Donbasshlyakhpostach
 Main information-calculation center
 Ukrainian state accounting center of international transportations
 State company "Ukrainian center of track works mechanization"
 Lisky
 Ukrainian center of passenger service (UTsOP)
 Ukrtransfarmatsia
 E-kvytok (translate Electronic ticket)

Other rail transport in Ukraine

Rail transport used for mass transit is usually administered by local government, typically city authorities; this includes trams, subway (metro), funicular and others. There are rapid transit systems in Kyiv, Kharkiv and Dnipro as well as tram systems among which the Kryvyi Rih Metrotram contains underground sections.

In mountainous regions various narrow gauge railways are owned and operated privately, sometimes in the form of heritage railways.

See also 
 Transport in Ukraine

Notes

References